Edwin Bertram Ford (22 September 1917 – 13 July 1946) was an Australian rules footballer who played with Richmond in the Victorian Football League (VFL) during the 1940s.

After arriving from Shepparton, Ford spent 1942 and 1943 with Richmond.  He made his debut against Melbourne at Punt Road in the second round of the 1942 VFL season, as Richmond amassed 196 to fall just three points short of their club record. The following week he appeared in his club's win over Collingwood but didn't play again for the rest of the year. In 1943 he played two further games, both against the same opponents from the previous season. He then decided to return home to the country, where he worked as a farmer.

Ford continued playing the game in the Central Goulburn Valley Football League as captain of Katandra. During the 1946 season, Ford was taking part in the third quarter of a match against Ardoma when he collided with an opposition player. He played out the game but became ill once he went home and was taken to Mooroopna Hospital where he died.

References

1917 births
1946 deaths
Richmond Football Club players
Shepparton Football Club players
Australian rules footballers from Victoria (Australia)
Sport deaths in Australia
Accidental deaths in Victoria (Australia)
People from Shepparton